Vasilios Ganotis (born 16 February 1942) is a Greek wrestler. He competed at the 1964 Summer Olympics, the 1968 Summer Olympics and the 1972 Summer Olympics.

References

External links
 

1942 births
Living people
Greek male sport wrestlers
Olympic wrestlers of Greece
Wrestlers at the 1964 Summer Olympics
Wrestlers at the 1968 Summer Olympics
Wrestlers at the 1972 Summer Olympics
20th-century Greek people